Damian Wojtaszek (born 7 September 1988) is a Polish professional volleyball player, a former member of the Poland national team, and the 2018 World Champion. At the professional club level, he plays for Projekt Warsaw.

Career

Clubs
In 2012, Wojtaszek joined Jastrzębski Węgiel. In the 2012–13 PlusLiga season, he won a bronze medal of the Polish Championship. In 2014, the club advanced to the Final Four of the Champions League held in Ankara, and after defeating Zenit Kazan won a bronze medal. Jastrzębski Węgiel, including Wojtaszek, ended the season with a second bronze medal of the Polish Championship. After two seasons in Asseco Resovia, he left the club in 2017. On 27 April 2017, Wojtaszek signed a two–year contract with ONICO Warszawa.

National team
On 14 August 2015, he achieved his first medal as a national team player – bronze of the European League. His national team won 3rd place match with Estonia (3–0). He also received individual award for the Best Libero of the tournament.

On 30 September 2018, Poland achieved its third title of the World Champion. Poland beat Brazil in the final and defended the title from 2014.

Honours

Clubs
 CEV Challenge Cup
  2011/2012 – with AZS Politechnika Warszawska
 National championships
 2015/2016  Polish Championship, with Asseco Resovia
 2018/2019  Polish Championship, with Onico Warsaw

Universiade
 2013  Summer Universiade

Individual awards
 2014: Polish Cup – Best Defender
 2014: CEV Champions League – Best Libero
 2015: European League – Best Libero

State awards
 2018:  Gold Cross of Merit

References

External links

 
 Player profile at PlusLiga.pl 
 Player profile at Volleybox.net

1988 births
Living people
People from Milicz
Polish men's volleyball players
European Games competitors for Poland
Volleyball players at the 2015 European Games
Universiade medalists in volleyball
Universiade silver medalists for Poland
Medalists at the 2013 Summer Universiade
Projekt Warsaw players
Jastrzębski Węgiel players
Resovia (volleyball) players
Liberos